The Miss Uruguay 2010 was held on February 27, 2010. The winners will represent Uruguay at Miss Universe 2010 and Miss World 2010. The first runner-up will go to Miss International 2010. The Best Departemental Costume would be used in Miss Universe. There were 22 candidates competing for the two titles.

Results

Special awards
 Miss Photogenic (voted by press reporters) - Natalie Yoffe (Florida)
 Miss Congeniality (voted by Miss Uruguay contestants) - María Marchioro (Flores)
 Miss Internet - Natalie Yoffe (Florida)
 Best Look - Lorena Carrasco (Durazno)
 Best Face - Natalie Yoffe (Florida)
 Best Departemental Costume - Reina Mota (Canelones)

Delegates

Official website
Miss Universo Uruguay

Miss Universo Uruguay
2010 in Uruguay
2010 beauty pageants